Football Thai Factory Sporting Goods Co, Ltd., also known as FBT, is a Thai sports equipment company. FBT exports to over 40 countries worldwide. In 2009 it had over 2,800 employees and an annual turnover of over US$50 million.

Sponsorships

Boxing
  Yokthai Sithoar
  Yodsanan Sor Nanthachai

Cricket
  South Kirkby Colliery

Football

Club Teams 
  Gelephu FC
  Ugyen Academy FC
  Phnom Penh Crown FC
  Nagaworld FC
  Svay Rieng Football Club
  Crewe Alexandra
  Nantwich Town
  Wakefield AFC
  Woodbank F.C.
  Young Elephants FC
  Club Eagles
  Felda United
  I.S.P.E F.C.
  Geylang International
  Tanjong Pagar United
  Police Tero F.C.
  Phichit F.C.
  Krabi F.C.
  Bangkok F.C.

Former club teams 
  Doncaster Rovers  (2017–2019)
  Scunthorpe United  (2017–2019)
  Boeung Ket  (?–2019)
  Ayeyawady United F.C. (2010-2015)
  Hanthawaddy United F.C.
  Kanbawza F.C.  (2009-2016)
  Yadanarbon F.C. (2010-2019)
  Yangon United F.C.
  Livingston  (2017–2019)
  Newport County  (2019–2020)
  Rhyl (2012–2014)
  Viettel (2020-2022)

Multi-sport Event
 2017 Southeast Asian Games and 2017 ASEAN Para Games
 2019 Southeast Asian Games

Track and field

National teams 
  Thailand

Awards
 Super Brands Award

References

External links
 

Thai brands
Shoe brands
Shoe companies of Thailand
Swimwear manufacturers
Sportswear brands
Companies based in Bangkok
Clothing companies established in 1952
1952 establishments in Thailand
Sporting goods manufacturers of Thailand